Mr. Lemon of Orange  is a 1931 American Pre-Code comedy film directed by John G. Blystone and starring El Brendel, Fifi D'Orsay and Ruth Warren. It was produced and distributed by the Fox Film Corporation.

Plot
El Brendel plays the dual role of Silent McGee, a tough gangster, and Mr. Oscar Lemon, a mild-mannered Swede who coincidentally looks exactly like the gangster McGee.  Silent McGee disguises himself as a Swedish immigrant while running from the law, causing Mr. Lemon to be mistaken for the wanted man.  Fifi D'Orsay stars as Julie LaRue, a comedic vamp who pursues the comparatively innocent Mr. Lemon.

Cast
El Brendel	as Mr. Lemon/Silent McGee
Fifi D'Orsay as Julie LaRue
William Collier Sr. as Mr. Blake
Ruth Warren as Mrs. Blake
Nat Pendleton as Gangster
Joan Castle as June Blake 
Don Dillaway as Jerry 
Eddie Gribbon as Walter 
 Erville Alderson as 	Mr. Brown 
 Jack Rutherford as Castro
 Dixie Lee as 	Hat Check Girl
 William H. O'Brien as	Waiter
 George Magrill as 	Henchman

Reception 
The New York Times''' Mordaunt Hall, wrote at the time, "Mr. Brendel is mildly funny in some of the scenes, but a little of this Swedish-accented comedian goes a long way. Miss Dorsay gives a lively performance and during the proceedings she hazards a song titled 'My Racket Is You.' Mr. Collier is worthy of better lines than are given to him in this film."

Notes
Anthony Slide, Eccentrics of Comedy'' (1998)

External links

NY Times review of Mr. Lemon of Orange

References 

1931 films
American black-and-white films
Films directed by John G. Blystone
1931 comedy films
Fox Film films
American comedy films
1930s English-language films
1930s American films